Troy Scott Taylor (born April 5, 1968) is an American football coach and former player who is currently the head coach of the Stanford Cardinal. Previously, he served as co-head football coach at Folsom High School in Folsom, California, from 2012 to 2015; co-offensive coordinator at Eastern Washington University in 2016; offensive coordinator at the University of Utah from 2017 to 2018; and as head coach at Sacramento State from 2019 to 2022.

Playing career
Taylor attended Cordova High School in Rancho Cordova, California. He led his team to a perfect 14-0 record and section championship, also being named northern California player of the year. Taylor played college football at California as starting quarterback from 1986–89 and was the team MVP 1987-89.  He led the Pac-10 conference in total offense in 1989 (253 yds. per game). He finished his collegiate career as Cal's all-time leading passer (8,126 yds.) and total offense leader (8,236 yds.), records that stood until they were broken by Jared Goff in 2015.  His 51 career touchdown passes stood as a school record until surpassed by Pat Barnes in 1996.

Taylor was drafted by the Jets in the 4th round (84th overall pick) in the 1990 NFL Draft by the New York Jets.  In his career, Taylor saw action in seven games and threw for 2 touchdown passes.

Coaching career
In 1994, Taylor served as offensive coordinator at Casa Roble High School in Orangevale, California.  He served one year on Rick Neuheisel's staff at the University of Colorado as a graduate assistant in 1995 primarily working with wide receivers.  He was hired by Steve Mariucci as Cal's wide receivers coach in 1996, and later served 2 years as a QB coach and 1 year as a tight ends coach under Tom Holmoe.

From 2000 to 2002, Taylor served as an assistant athletic director and coach for Christian Brothers High School in Sacramento. From 2002 to 2004, Taylor served as the Co-head coach of football at Folsom High School.  He left that position in 2005 to serve as color analyst for the California Golden Bears' radio broadcast.  In 2012, he returned to Folsom High as co-head coach of football, during the 4-year period he was there the bulldogs went 58-3 winning 4 consecutive section championships and a state title.

Taylor coached Washington quarterback Jake Browning since he was in 5th grade up until his senior year in high school, when he set the national touchdown record in a career with 229 TD passes while also tying a record of 91 touchdown passes in a single season, all while going 16–0 and a D1 state championship.

Taylor's offense at Folsom High School broke the state in passing for 4 straight years and set a state record for most points scored in a season, a record that still stands today.
On February 18, 2016, Taylor was announced as the passing game coordinator and quarterbacks coach for Eastern Washington.

At Eastern Washington, Taylor called plays and took an already stellar offense to new heights as they set 2 all-time FCS records for passing yards (5,160 yards) and total offense (5,766 yards) in a season.

Taylor was instrumental in helping develop former walk-on quarterback Gage Gubrud into a record-setting QB who broke the all-time single-season FCS passing record and the all-time record in total offense. Gubrud also won the FCS player of the year award from numerous sites along with Big Sky Conference co-MVP (with teammate Cooper Kupp). Eastern Washington was also the only team to have 3 wide receivers over 1,000 yards in the season.

Gubrud also set 16 school records, 7 Big Sky records, and 2 FCS records, all while winning the Big Sky Conference title and going undefeated in conference play. Eastern Washington improved in almost every offensive statistical category in his first year. A notable win came in the first game of the season against Washington State where the Eagles won 45–42 and set a school record for total offense.

On December 17, 2018, Taylor accepted the head coaching position at Sacramento State after spending the previous two years as the offensive coordinator at Utah.

On August 31, 2019, Taylor debuted in his first collegiate game as head coach, in which his team defeated Southern Oregon 77–19.

On November 23, 2019, Taylor and his Hornets football team clinched the school's first-ever share of the Big Sky Conference title in a 27–17 victory over the UC Davis Aggies in the 2019 Causeway Classic game. This was Sacramento State's first Big Sky Conference title since the team's induction into the Big Sky in 1996.

On November 19, 2022, Taylor would lead the Hornets to their first undefeated regular season in school history after a 27–21 victory over UC Davis in the 2022 Causeway Classic along with their third Big Sky Conference title.

Head coaching record

College

References

1968 births
Living people
American football quarterbacks
California Golden Bears football coaches
California Golden Bears football players
Colorado Buffaloes football coaches
Eastern Washington Eagles football coaches
New York Jets players
Stanford Cardinal football coaches
Sacramento State Hornets football coaches
Utah Utes football coaches
High school football coaches in California
Sportspeople from Downey, California
People from Folsom, California
Coaches of American football from California
Players of American football from California